This is a disambiguation page for the common name Francine.

Francine is a female given name. The name is of French origin. The name Francine was most popular in France itself during the 1940s (Besnard & Desplanques 2003), and was well used in the United States during the 1940s and 1950s (Evans 2006). Short forms are Frannie, Frans and Fran.

Translations
English: Frankie
French: Françoise
German: Franziska
Italian: Francesca
Dutch : Francien
Norwegian: Frances
Polish: Franciszka
Catalan: Francina
Portuguese: Francesa, Francisca
Spanish: Francisca
Zulu: Rancina
Slovak: Frantiska
Afrikaans: Francine

Persons
Francine (band), indie rock band from Boston
Francine Bergé (born 1938), French film and stage actress
Francine Descartes (1635–1640), René Descartes' daughter
Francine Diaz (born 2004), Filipina teen actress and model
Francine Fournier (born 1972), professional wrestler
Francine Jordi (born 1977), Swiss pop singer
Francine Lalonde (born 1940), Canadian Quebec provincial politician
Francine McKenna, American journalist, blogger, and columnist
Francine Misasi (1944–2001), Clerk of the New York State Assembly 1985–2000
Francine Mussey (1897–1933), French actress
Francine Pascal (born 1938), American author
Francine Pelletier (writer) (born 1959), Canadian science fiction author
Francine Pelletier (journalist) (born c. 1955), Canadian television and print journalist
Francine Prieto (born 1982), Filipino-Norwegian beauty queen, fashion model, product endorser, singer, actress and child star
Francine Prose (born 1947), American writer
Francine Reed (born 1947), American blues singer
Francine Rivers (born 1947), American author of fiction with Christian themes 
Francine Stock (born 1958), British radio and TV presenter and novelist
Francine Villeneuve (born 1964), Canadian thoroughbred jockey and racing pioneer
Francine Weisweiller née Worms (1916–2003), French socialite and patron of Yves Saint Laurent and Jean Cocteau
Francine York (1936–2017), American movie and television actress

Fictional characters
Francine Briggs, a mean English teacher in the Nickelodeon sitcom iCarly portrayed by Mindy Sterling
Francine Frensky, fictional character on the children's book and animated television series Arthur voiced by Jodie Resther
Francine Smith, fictional character on the animated television series American Dad! voiced by Wendy Schaal
Francine "Frankie" Osborne, character in UK soap opera Hollyoaks portrayed by Helen Pearson
Francine, an Animal Crossing snooty villager
Francine Nebulon, a character on the TV series Lloyd in Space voiced by Nicolette Little
 Francine "Franny" Fantootsie, titular character from the children's animated television series Franny's Feet voiced by Phoebe McAuley
 Francine Carruthers, a major antagonist from the TV series The Electric Company portrayed by Ashley Austin Morris
 Francine, a female sloth from Ice Age: Collision Course voiced by Melissa Rauch

Other
"Francine" (song), a 1971 song by American rock band ZZ Top from their album Rio Grande Mud

See also
Francene Cosman
Francina (name)

References
 Besnard, P. & Desplanques, G. La cote des prénoms en 2004. Paris: Balland. 
 Evans, C. K. (2006). The great big book of baby names. Lincolnwood, Illinois: Publications International Limited. .

Given names
French feminine given names
English feminine given names